Rodgers + Hammerstein's Cinderella is an original cast album of the first Broadway production of the musical Cinderella, with music by Richard Rodgers, lyrics by Oscar Hammerstein II and a book by Douglas Carter Beane based partly on Hammerstein's 1957 book. The story is based upon the fairy tale Cinderella, particularly the French version Cendrillon, ou la Petite Pantoufle de Vair, by Charles Perrault.  The production opened in 2013.  In Beane's plot, Cinderella opens Prince Topher's eyes to the injustice in the kingdom.

The original cast album produced by Ghostlight Records was recorded on March 17-18, 2013 at MSR Studios, New York City, released digitally on May 7, 2013 and released in physical format on June 4, 2013. The album includes the best-known songs from the original version of the musical and also features four songs from the Rodgers and Hammerstein catalogue, including "Now Is the Time", cut from South Pacific.  The cast includes Laura Osnes in the title role, Santino Fontana as the Prince, Victoria Clark as crazy Marie/the Fairy Godmother, Harriet Harris as Cinderella's stepmother, Peter Bartlett as the Prime Minister, Ann Harada and Marla Mindelle as stepsisters Charlotte and Gabrielle, and Greg Hildreth as the rebel Jean-Michel.

Reception
[To come]

References

External links 
Official Broadway production website
Official Broadway production lyrics
Rodgers + Hammerstein's Cinderella at the Internet Broadway Database

Adaptations of works by Charles Perrault
Cast recordings
Music based on fairy tales
Works based on Cinderella